The Most Beautifullest Thing in This World is the debut solo studio album by American rapper Keith Murray. It was released November 8, 1994 via Jive Records. Recording sessions took place at Rockin' Reel Studios in East Northport, New York and at The Music Palace in West Hempstead, New York. Production was handled by Erick Sermon, who also served as executive producer, Redman, Rod "KP" Kirkpatrick and Busta Rhymes. It features guest appearances from Erick Sermon, Redman, Hurricane Gee, Jamal and Paul Hightower.

The album peaked at number thirty-four on the US Billboard 200 chart and number five on the Top R&B/Hip-Hop Albums chart. It was certified gold in sales by the Recording Industry Association of America on August 4, 1995, after sales exceeding 500,000 copies in the United States.\

Track listing

Personnel
Keith Murray – main artist
Erick Sermon – featured artist (tracks: 7, 10), producer (tracks: 1-14, 16), executive producer, re-mixing (track 16)
Jamal Phillips – featured artist (track 7)
Reginald "Redman" Noble – featured artist (track 10), producer (track 15)
Gloria "Hurricane G" Rodríguez – featured artist (track 13)
Paul Hightower – featured artist (track 13)
Rod 'KP' Kirkpatrick – producer (tracks: 3, 7)
Trevor "Busta Rhymes" Smith Jr. – producer (track 7)
Bob Fudjinski – recording (tracks: 1-7, 10-16), mixing (tracks: 1-7, 9-16)
Dave Greenberg – recording (tracks: 4, 8, 9, 16), mixing (track 8)
Tony Dawsey – mastering
Daniel Hastings – design, photography
Cartel – design, photography

Charts

Weekly charts

Year-end charts

Singles

Certifications

References

External links

1994 debut albums
Jive Records albums
Keith Murray (rapper) albums
Albums produced by Erick Sermon